The Klewang-class fast attack craft is a stealth, wave-piercing, carbon trimaran fast attack craft built by PT Lundin Industry Invest and designed by LOMOcean Marine. Shortly after being floated out, on 28 September 2012, KRI Klewang was destroyed by fire while being outfitted at shipyard. The second ship in the class KRI Golok was launched on 21 August 2021.

Design
The vessel has a complement of 29 personnel, including a team of special forces.

Klewang was planned to be armed with four and up to eight C-705 anti-ship missiles in enclosed launchers and a Type 730 CIWS in stealthy turret. According to the builder, the vessel also able to be armed with Penguin or Exocet missiles and naval gun of up to 57 mm caliber without affecting the stability of the vessel. She also carried an 11 m high-speed rigid-hulled inflatable boat for the special forces team.

History
The Indonesian Navy ordered the first of four for delivery starting in 2012.  The first of these was named  and was launched on 29 August 2012; however, only four weeks later the ship caught fire on 28 September while undergoing fit-out in Banyuwangi, and was completely destroyed.

Replacement
A replacement 63 m trimaran was ordered in Banyuwangi, and was expected to be launched in early 2016. In the interim period, advances in infusable vinylester resin chemistry have seen the incorporation of nano particles into the resin. These particles aid the transfer of the resin through the carbon/glass fibre matrix and allow the use of fire retardant grade vinylester for infusion. This makes the carbon fibre composite structure of the new vessel self-extinguishing. The ship was launched on 21 August 2021, and named as KRI Golok (hull no. 688). Golok was commissioned on 14 January 2022 at Surabaya.

Ship in the class

References

Missile boats of the Indonesian Navy
Missile boat classes